Ah Long Pte Ltd is a 2008 action comedy film directed by Singaporean film director Jack Neo, starring Fann Wong and Mark Lee. Co-produced by Mediacorp Raintree Pictures, Scorpio East Pictures and Double Vision (Malaysia), the film was mostly shot in Malaysia, in the city of Kuala Lumpur, with a budget of S$1.2 million. This film is also the seventh collaboration between Mediacorp Raintree Pictures and Jack Neo.

Ah Long Pte Ltd was released in Singapore on 7 February 2008, and in Malaysia on 13 March. Its languages consist of Mandarin (in a heavily Johor-accented version as spoken by Mark Lee), Hokkien and Cantonese.

Plot
Chen Jun is the leader of Shao He Triad, which has a number of illegal businesses operating in Malaysia and Singapore. He is retiring from the Triad and money-lending business. He is succeeded by a young lady, Wang Lihua, who tries to restructure the "Ah Long (loan shark) system" with as little use of violence as possible while making debtors pay back.

Lihua and several of her subordinates start implementing a series of creative methods to attract people to borrow money. They also practice hilarious methods to pressure debtors to repay in a way that is anti-violent. However, this restructuring is met with opposition from the majority of the "elders" in both her own and rival triad (the Qinglongs).

Lihua is pressured by her mother to get married. Lihua decides to force Mr Fang, an effeminate dance instructor, to marry her. Mr Fang agrees to the proposal, wanting to prove his masculinity. Subsequently, Mr Fang offers to help Lihua out by introducing creative ways to reduce violent methods of debt collection.

Chen Jun is opposed to these less-violent ways of debt collection, but appears to have a change of heart.  However, Lihua and her gang members get embroiled with a fight with a rival triad, whose head, it is later revealed, is acting under Chen Jun's instigation. Lihua and Fang go on the run with the Malaysian police and three gang members on their heels. Chen Jun, Lihua and Fang get caught by a number of street urchins, who turn out to be children of debtors who were killed after failing to pay back Chen Jun's gang their loan money.

Finally, the Malaysian police nab Chen Jun, Lihua and her company for their illegal dealings. They are sentenced to jail terms (except Chen Jun, who was executed). Mr Fang fetches Lihua on the day of her release, and surprises her by bringing her to an office dealing in legal business, run by former members of the Shao He Triad (whom some of them once had terms of 8–10 years). Lihua finds the drive to lead again after being in jail for 10 years.

Cast

 Fann Wong as Wang Lihua 王立华
 Mark Lee as Jojo Fang 方佐佐
 Richard Low as Chen Jun 陈军
 KK Wong as Bingtou 兵头
 Daniel Tan as Huangdi 皇帝
 Jack Lim as Hong Qinglong 洪青龙
 Lai Meng as Lihua's Mother

Production
Jack Neo feels that most people think that loan sharks are "heartless and evil", however after research, he has found out that there are "kind and caring" loan sharks as well. He was sure that the film would be well received by Singaporeans. The scriptwriting took 6 months to complete, while the film is shot in 35 days. Neo went against the social norm by using a woman as a loan shark (ah-longs were generally male gangsters) and having her propose marriage (which is against traditional Chinese custom).

Reception
A series of roadshows were held at Ang Mo Kio Hub on 19 January 2008.

Ah Long Pte Ltd'''s commercial success was evident despite mixed reviews from the press. The Straits Times reported on 13 February that over the Chinese New Year weekend, the film reaped a box-office takings of S$1.47 million, coming in second behind Stephen Chow's CJ7 ($2 million), while beating Jay Chou's Kung Fu Dunk ($1.41 million). All three films were released in Singapore on 7 February 2008. Ah Long Lte Ltd broke the previous record for biggest opening weekend for local productions, a record it held until it was broken in 2012 by another Jack Neo film Ah Boys to Men, which earned S$1.509 million on its opening weekend.

The ranking remained the same as of 19 February, when the box-office earnings of CJ7 was almost S$3 million ($2,840,282), Ah Long S$2.4m and Kungfu Dunk at S$1.96m.

Reviews from local magazine 8 Days were largely negative. The film was rated as half a star out of five.

Criticism
Various film reviews indicated that this film had "copied ideas" from Cho Jin-gyu's My Wife Is a Gangster 3. There was also a scene in which Lihua performed soccer tricks, and was pointed out by critics for copying Stephen Chow's Shaolin Soccer''.

References

External links

2008 films
Films directed by Jack Neo
Hokkien-language films
2000s Cantonese-language films
2000s Mandarin-language films
Singaporean comedy films
Triad films
2008 action comedy films
2008 comedy films
2000s Hong Kong films